Sunday league football is a term used in Britain and Ireland to describe the amateur association football competitions which take place on Sunday rather than the more usual Saturday.  The term pub league may also be used, owing to the number of public houses that enter teams.  Sunday league football is stereotypically seen as being taken less seriously than Saturday football and involving players who are often unfit or hungover, and the term "Sunday league" can be used to denote a performance which is inept or amateurish.  Despite this perception, however, some leagues include players who also play at a high level of semi-professional football on Saturdays.

Sunday leagues are sanctioned by the local County Football Association.  Sunday leagues do not form part of the hierarchical English football league system, but Sunday teams can opt to switch to Saturday play and potentially rise up the levels of the league system.  The FA Sunday Cup is a national knock-out competition for English Sunday league football teams administered by the FA, which has been staged since 1964. 

The most prominent single location for Sunday league football is Hackney Marshes in east London, which has been called the "spiritual home" of Sunday league. The oldest Sunday League in England is the Edmonton & District Sunday Football League, based in North London, which was formed in 1925.

In March 2012, Wheel Power F.C. won 58–0 against Nova 2010 F.C. in the Torbay Sunday League to record what was believed to be the largest victory ever achieved in British football.

Television coverage
In 1991, Danny Baker hosted The Game, a TV series focusing on East London Sunday League matches at Hackney Marshes, on Friday nights on LWT.  The title of the show was a spoof of The Match, formerly The Big Match, the banner under which major league matches were televised on ITV at the time.  The series ran for six episodes, culminating in the final of the Dick Coppock Cup (for Division Four of the league).

See also
Sunday league football in England

References

Non-League football
League football